Usulután Airport  is an airstrip serving the city of Usulután in Usulután Department, El Salvador. There is a hangar and fueling tank next to the north end of the runway.

See also

 Transport in El Salvador
 List of airports in El Salvador

References

External links
OpenStreetMap - Usulután Airport
 HERE - Usulután
FallingRain - Usulután Airport

Airports in El Salvador